An infinitary logic is a logic that allows infinitely long statements and/or infinitely long proofs. Some infinitary logics may have different properties from those of standard first-order logic. In particular, infinitary logics may fail to be compact or complete. Notions of compactness and completeness that are equivalent in finitary logic sometimes are not so in infinitary logics. Therefore for infinitary logics, notions of strong compactness and strong completeness are defined. This article addresses Hilbert-type infinitary logics, as these have been extensively studied and constitute the most straightforward extensions of finitary logic. These are not, however, the only infinitary logics that have been formulated or studied.

Considering whether a certain infinitary logic named Ω-logic is complete promises to throw light on the continuum hypothesis.

A word on notation and the axiom of choice
As a language with infinitely long formulae is being presented, it is not possible to write such formulae down explicitly. To get around this problem a number of notational conveniences, which, strictly speaking, are not part of the formal language, are used.  is used to point out an expression that is infinitely long. Where it is unclear, the length of the sequence is noted afterwards. The same notation may be applied to quantifiers, for example . This is meant to represent an infinite sequence of quantifiers: a quantifier for each  where .

The axiom of choice is assumed (as is often done when discussing infinitary logic) as this is necessary to have sensible distributivity laws.

Definition of Hilbert-type infinitary logics

A first-order infinitary language Lα,β, α regular, β = 0 or ω ≤ β ≤ α, has the same set of symbols as a finitary logic and may use all the rules for formation of formulae of a finitary logic together with some additional ones:
(In each case the sequence has length .)
(In each case the sequence of quantifiers has length .)

The concepts of free and bound variables apply in the same manner to infinite formulae. Just as in finitary logic, a formula all of whose variables are bound is referred to as a sentence.

A theory T in infinitary language  is a set of sentences in the logic. A proof in infinitary logic from a theory T is a (possibly infinite) sequence of statements that obeys the following conditions: Each statement is either a logical axiom, an element of T, or is deduced from previous statements using a rule of inference. As before, all rules of inference in finitary logic can be used, together with an additional one:

Given a set of statements  that have occurred previously in the proof then the statement  can be inferred.

The logical axiom schemata specific to infinitary logic are presented below. Global schemata variables:  and  such that .

For each , 
The last two axiom schemata require the axiom of choice because certain sets must be well orderable. The last axiom schema is strictly speaking unnecessary, as Chang's distributivity laws imply it, however it is included as a natural way to allow natural weakenings to the logic.

Completeness, compactness, and strong completeness
A theory is any set of sentences. The truth of statements in models are defined by recursion and will agree with the definition for finitary logic where both are defined. Given a theory T a sentence is said to be valid for the theory T if it is true in all models of T.

A logic in the language  is complete if for every sentence S valid in every model there exists a proof of S. It is strongly complete if for any theory T for every sentence S valid in T there is a proof of S from T. An infinitary logic can be complete without being strongly complete.

A cardinal  is weakly compact when for every theory T in  containing at most  many formulas, if every S  T of cardinality less than  has a model, then T has a model.

Concepts expressible in infinitary logic
In the language of set theory the following statement expresses foundation:

Unlike the axiom of foundation, this statement admits no non-standard interpretations. The concept of well-foundedness can only be expressed in a logic that allows infinitely many quantifiers in an individual statement. As a consequence many theories, including Peano arithmetic, which cannot be properly axiomatised in finitary logic, can be in a suitable infinitary logic. Other examples include the theories of non-archimedean fields and torsion-free groups. These three theories can be defined without the use of infinite quantification; only infinite junctions are needed.

Complete infinitary logics
Two infinitary logics stand out in their completeness. The former is standard finitary first-order logic and the latter is an infinitary logic that only allows statements of countable size.

The logic of  fails to be compact, but it is complete (under the axioms given above). Moreover, it satisfies a variant of the Craig interpolation property.

References

Systems of formal logic
Non-classical logic